UGP may refer to:
Ukrainian Galician Party, a Ukrainian political party in Galicia
United Goans Party, former political party in Goa, Daman and Diu, a territory of India
United General Party, former name of the United Peoples Party (Fiji)
Ukrainian Gothic Portal